The fourth season of the animated television series My Little Pony: Friendship Is Magic, developed by Lauren Faust, originally aired on the Hub Network in the United States. The series is based on Hasbro's My Little Pony line of toys and animated works and is often referred by collectors to be the fourth generation, or "G4", of the My Little Pony franchise. Season 4 of the series premiered on November 23, 2013 on the Hub Network, an American pay television channel partly owned by Hasbro, and concluded on May 10, 2014.

The show follows a pony named Twilight Sparkle as she learns about friendship in the town of Ponyville. Twilight, who has just become an alicorn princess, continues to learn with her close friends Applejack, Rarity, Fluttershy, Rainbow Dash and Pinkie Pie. Each represents a different face of friendship, and Twilight discovers herself to be a key part of the magical artifacts, the "Elements of Harmony". The ponies share adventures and help out other residents of Ponyville, while working out the troublesome moments in their own friendships.

Development

Concept 
Season 4 continues from the events of the third season finale, "Magical Mystery Cure", where Twilight, shown to have come to hone her magic skills while learning the value of friendship, has been crowned as Equestria's newest princess, becoming an alicorn in the process. Some elements of the season focus on Twilight coming to terms with her new status; lead writer Meghan McCarthy stated that "What we didn't want to do was change who Twilight is as a character, because she's certainly someone that everyone's proud to know and love", while Tara Strong, the voice actress for Twilight, claimed that the episode is "a birth of a new era for Twilight, but not the end of what makes the show so wonderful". In addition, with the directive of the letters to Princess Celestia no longer in force, the six main characters also resolve to keep a collective journal of their formative experiences for posterity's sake. According to a Twitter post from McCarthy, the season also includes a story arc that features the ponies on the hunt to find keys to open a mysterious six locked chest.

Production 
Investment documents for DHX Media's 2012 financial year indicate that production for a fourth season had been financed. Before the season premiered, aspects of it were discussed by Meghan McCarthy, Tara Strong and other writers and voice actors at various fan conventions. Hasbro's vice president for international distribution, Finn Arnesen, had stated that My Little Pony is a "top-priority" brand for the company and expects the series to continue beyond the fourth season. The fourth season of the series premiered on November 23, 2013. This season marks the first time storyboard artist Jim Miller will be co-directing alongside Jayson Thiessen. This season also marks the first time to be executive produced by Thiessen and McCarthy.

Cast

Main 
 Tara Strong as Twilight Sparkle
 Rebecca Shoichet as Twilight Sparkle (singing voice)
 Tabitha St. Germain as Rarity
 Kazumi Evans as Rarity (singing voice)
 Ashleigh Ball as Applejack and Rainbow Dash
 Andrea Libman as Fluttershy and Pinkie Pie
 Shannon Chan-Kent as Pinkie Pie (singing voice); Libman occasionally
 Cathy Weseluck as Spike

Recurring 

 Nicole Oliver as Princess Celestia
 Tabitha St. Germain as Princess Luna
 Kazumi Evans as Princess Luna (singing voice)
 The Cutie Mark Crusaders
 Michelle Creber as Apple Bloom
 Madeleine Peters as Scootaloo
 Claire Corlett as Sweetie Belle
 Britt McKillip as Princess Cadance
 Andrew Francis as Shining Armor
 John de Lancie as Discord

Minor 

 Brenda Crichlow as Zecora
 Chiara Zanni as Daring Do/A.K. Yearling
 Brian Drummond as Ahuizotl and Seabreeze
 Michael Dobson as Dr. Caballeron and Bulk Biceps
 Ashleigh Ball as Prim Hemline
 Tabitha St. Germain as Suri Polomare and Zipporwhill
Cathy Weseluck as Coco Pommel
 Peter New as Big McIntosh
 Tabitha St. Germain as Granny Smith and Mrs. Cake
 Peter New as Goldie Delicious and Zipporwhill's father
 Kelly Metzger as Spitfire and Helia
 Matt Hill as Soarin
 Andrea Libman as Fleetfoot
 Brian Drummond as Mr. Cake
 Nicole Oliver as Cheerilee
 Chantal Strand as Diamond Tiara
 Shannon Chan-Kent as Silver Spoon
 Lee Tockar as Snips
 Richard Ian Cox as Snails
 Rena Anakwe as Sapphire Shores
 The Flim Flam Brothers
 Samuel Vincent as Flim
 Scott McNeil as Flam
 Veena Sood as Ms. Harshwhinny

Guest stars 

 Ellen Kennedy as the Mane-iac and the Chimera
 Cathy Weseluck as Torch Song
 Jerrica Santos as Torch Song (singing voice)
 Trevor Devall as Thunderlane
 "Weird Al" Yankovic as Cheese Sandwich
 Doron Bell as Trenderhoof
 Alvin Sanders as Flutterguy
 Marcus Mosley as Flutterguy (singing voice)
 Danny Balkwill as Toe-Tapper
 Graham Verchere as Pipsqueak
 Ingrid Nilson as Maud Pie
 Ian James Corlett as Silver Shill
 Sylvain LeVasseur Portelance as Stellar Eclipse
 Jay Brazeau as Claude the Puppeteer
 Vincent Tong as Flash Sentry and Duke of Maretonia
 Mark Acheson as Lord Tirek

Episodes

Songs

DVD release

Notes

References 

2013 American television seasons
2014 American television seasons
4
2013 Canadian television seasons
2014 Canadian television seasons